Blastobasis pulchella is a moth in the family Blastobasidae. It is found in North America, including Nova Scotia, Washington DC and Maine.

The ground colour of the forewings is pale ochreous-brown with a silver white fascia at one-third, heavily shaded with dark brown.

References

Moths described in 1910
Blastobasis